The list of wooden synagogues shows destroyed and extant synagogues, the builders of which adapted an architecture traditional in Central and Eastern Europe to the requirements of Jewish worship. All the large, representative wooden synagogues were destroyed by the end of World War II. Today only a few simple wooden synagogues exist, most of them in Lithuania. Synagogues that no longer exist are recorded as far as they are more precisely known from drawings or photographs.

If years are given in italics, then these are approximate values.

The use of wood as a building material for synagogues was obvious in a wooded region; churches were also initially built as wooden structures. However, a synod in Piotrków in the 16th century demanded that synagogues always be made of wood, not stone, so that stone buildings for Jewish communities were only possible with special permission. Wooden synagogues remained the norm at a time when Christian churches were mostly built as stone. The political space in which wooden synagogues with typical construction features and painting patterns developed was the Poland-Lithuania Commonwealth (1569–1795), in which the Jewish Council of the Four Lands existed (1580–1764).

Navigation: A B C D G H I J K
L M N O P R S T U
V W Z

List of wooden synagogues, sorted by place

Reception in the modern synagogue building 

Since the publication of the book Wooden Synagogues by Maria and Kazimierz Piechotka (1959), some American architects have been referring to the formal language of Polish wooden synagogues:

 Sons of Israel Synagogue, Lakewood (David, Brody und Wisniewski 1963);
 Brith Kodesh, Rochester (Pietro Belluschi 1963);
 Beth El, Chappaqua (Lous Kahn, 1966/72);
 Adath Yeshurun, Syracuse (Percival Goodman, 1970er Jahre);
 The Jewish Center of the Hamptons (Norman Jaffe, 1989);
 The Orthodox Hampton Synagogue (Eddie Jacobs).

Replicas 

There is a replica of the Wołpa Synagogue synagogue is in Bilgoraj, and another replica of the synagogue (Połaniec) is in Sanok.

POLIN Museum of the History of Polish Jews in Warsaw has a partial reconstruction of the Gwoździec Synagogue. The ceiling painting of the synagogue in Chodoriw was reconstructed for the ANU - Museum of the Jewish People (Beit Hatefusot) in Tel Aviv.

In the Musée d'Art et d'Histoire du Judaïsme (Museum of Jewish Art and History) in Paris there are models of several wooden synagogues.

Further reading
 Alois Breier, Max Eisler, Max Grunwald: Holzsynagogen in Polen. Sohar, 1934.
 Aliza Cohen-Mushlin, Sergey Kravtsov, Vladimir Levin, Giedrė Mickūnaitė, Jurgita Šiaučiūnaitė-Verbickienė: Synagogues in Lithuania A–M: A catalogue. Vilnius Academy of Arts Press, Vilnius 2010.
 Aliza Cohen-Mushlin, Sergey Kravtsov, Vladimir Levin, Giedrė Mickūnaitė, Jurgita Šiaučiūnaitė-Verbickienė: Synagogues in Lithuania N–Ž: A catalogue. Vilnius Academy of Arts Press, Vilnius 2012.
 Maria Piechotka, Kazimierz Piechotka: Heaven's Gates: Masonry Synagogues in the Territories of the Former Polish-Lithuanian Commonwealth. Warsaw 2004.
 Mathias Bersohn: Kilka słów o dawniejszych bóżnicach drewnianych w Polsce. 3. Warsaw 1903.

References

External links 

 Musée d'Art et d'Histoire du Judaïsme: Plan of the synagogue.
 Lithuanian Jewish Community: Wooden Synagogues: Lithuania’s Unique Ethnic Architectural Legacy.
 Lithuanian wooden synagogues.
 The Hebrew University of Jerusalem, The Center for Jewish Art: Preserved Wooden Synagogues in Lithuania.
 Bilder, Kurzbeschreibung litauischer Holzsynagogen: Wooden synagogues in Lithuania
 European Routes of Jewish Heritage: The Wooden Synagogues of Central and Eastern Europe.

Polish-Lithuanian
Polish–Lithuanian Commonwealth
Synagogues
Synagogues
Synagogues
.
.
.
Sacral architecture
Ashkenazi Jews topics
Wooden buildings and structures in Lithuania
Wooden buildings and structures in Poland
Wooden buildings and structures in Ukraine